Chang Ch‘i-yun (29 September 1901 – 26 August 1985) was a Chinese historian, geographer, educator and politician. He was the founder of the Chinese Culture University and the Nanhai Academy and served as Minister of Education of the Republic of China. He was a lead editor on the Zhongwen Da Cidian.

Chang Ch‘i-yün graduated from the Division of History and Geography of National Nanjing Higher Normal School (later renamed National Central University and Nanjing University), where he studied from scholars such as Liu Yizheng, Zhu Kezhen and Liu Boming.

His son is Chang Jen-Hu, an educator in Taiwan.

Works
《清史》 "Qing Shi" History of Qing, 1961.

References

1901 births
1985 deaths
Chinese geographers
Republic of China historians
National Central University alumni
Nanjing University alumni
Senior Advisors to President Chiang Ching-kuo
Taiwanese Ministers of Education
Writers from Ningbo
Educators from Ningbo
Academic staff of Zhejiang University
Academic staff of the National Central University
Scientists from Ningbo
Kuomintang politicians in Taiwan
Politicians from Ningbo
Republic of China politicians from Zhejiang
Taiwanese people from Zhejiang
Historians from Zhejiang
20th-century geographers